Polish Youth Olympic Days (Ogólnopolska Olimpiada Młodzieży), are Polish national games for the children and young adults that have been organised yearly since 1995. The games are held in four categories of sport:
winter sports
summer sports
cross country running
hall sports

References

External links
 Ogólnopolskie Olimpiady Młodzieży

Youth olympics
Poland youth
Recurring sporting events established in 1995
Youth sport in Poland
National youth sports competitions